Artika Sari Devi Kusmayadi (born 29 September 1979) is an Indonesian actress, model and the winner of Puteri Indonesia 2004 (Miss Universe Indonesia), She also representing Indonesia in 2005 Miss Universe pageant in Bangkok, Thailand. She is the first ever Indonesian and Sumatran to be placed as a finalist in Miss Universe history.

Biography
Devi was born in Pangkal Pinang, Bangka-Belitung Islands. She holds a law degree from Gadjah Mada University, Yogyakarta. She is married to a singer and musician Ibrahim Imran in 2008, and she gave birth to a daughter, Sarah Abiela Ibrahim (2009) and Dayana Zoelie Ibrahim (2011). Besides being a full-time mother, Devi also runs a fashion line for kids called "Sugar Bebe Indonesia". In 2016, Artika together with Puteri Indonesia 2013 beauty pageant alumna Whulandary Herman, open the "ArtikaWhulandary Beauty Camp" to sharpen the skills of Indonesian women who are interested in joining local or international beauty pageants, the beauty camp idea is first initiated in 2013.

Pageantry

Puteri Indonesia 2004
At the age of 25, she represented Bangka Belitung Islands in the Puteri Indonesia 2004 pageant, and was crowned on 6 August 2004 in the Jakarta Convention Center.

Miss Universe 2005
Devi represented Indonesia in Miss Universe 2005 and was the first Indonesian woman to advance to semifinals, competed in the Evening Gown Competition finished in the Top 15.

Post-Miss Universe
Although not reported to the police, there was a controversy surrounding her involvement in the Miss Universe 2005 pageant, Devi was accused of breaking the Code of Law 281, edict number 01/U/1984, regarding cultural and educational conducts, Indonesian law forbids any kind of involvement in international beauty pageants and considers such as immoral. In 2006, the winner of Puteri Indonesia 2005 and participant of Miss Universe 2006, Nadine Chandrawinata was also reported to the police, which eventually traced back to Artika Sari Devi and the Puteri Indonesia Foundation.

Filmography
Devi started her foray into the world of acting, after starred in a musical Indonesian film called "Opera Jawa" (Requiem from Java) directed by Garin Nugroho, which was nominated for 2006 Toronto International Film Festival, 2006 London Film Festival, 2006 Pusan International Film Festival and 2006 Venice Film Festival. The movie also being nominated for "Best Movie" in Indonesian Film Festival, won the Silver Screen Award for Best Film at the 2007 Singapore International Film Festival.

Movies

Awards and nomination

References

External links
 
 Artika Sari Devi Kusmayadi Official Instagram
 Official Puteri Indonesia Official Website
 Official Miss Universe Official Website
 

Living people
1979 births
Puteri Indonesia winners
Indonesian beauty pageant winners
Indonesian female models
Indonesian film actresses
Indonesian Muslims
Indonesian people of Malay descent
Miss Universe 2005 contestants
People from Pangkal Pinang
Gadjah Mada University alumni